Elisabeth Jensen is an education advocate and the Democratic Party nominee for Kentucky's 6th congressional district in the United States House of Representatives elections in Kentucky, 2014.

Early life and career
Elisabeth Jensen was born in Indiana and graduated from Perry Meridian High School in Indianapolis after attending Aiglon College. Jensen earned a degree in design and merchandising from the Wood Tobé-Coburn School and attended the Fashion Institute of Technology. Jensen was an executive for Disney Consumer Products but, as a lifelong horse enthusiast, decided to move to Kentucky in order to work with Thoroughbreds. In 2000, Jensen became the manager of Tracy Farmer's stables and later managed public relations for WinStar Farm. In 2002, Jensen co-founded The Race for Education, an organization that provides services such as scholarships and financial literacy training to students with financial needs. The Race for Education has provided over $5 million in scholarships and education programs and has earned recognition from the White House Office of Faith-Based and Neighborhood Partnerships. Jensen founded another organization in 2009 called Starting Gate, an after-school organization for middle school students that is currently offered in Fayette and Bourbon counties. She has also been involved in an organization called Unique that provides support for families with children that have unique and chromosome disorders.

Jensen graduated from Emerge Kentucky, a political-training program for women. She has served as a volunteer for several political campaigns, including Gov. Steve Beshear and U.S. Rep. Ben Chandler, and was an alternate delegate to the Democratic National Convention in 2012. In 2011, Gov. Steve Beshear appointed Jensen to the Kentucky Department of Education's  State Advisory Panel for Exceptional Children.

2014 Congressional campaign

In December 2013, Jensen filed to run for the Democratic nomination for Kentucky's 6th congressional district in the United States House of Representatives elections in Kentucky, 2014. Jensen was seen as the front-runner for the Democratic nomination and was endorsed by Adam Edelen, Jack Conway, Jerry Abramson, John Yarmuth, Emily's List, Teamsters, UFCW, AFGE, NALC, Pam Miller, Reggie Thomas, Sannie Overly, and Susan Westrom. In March 2014, Jensen received endorsements from the AFL-CIO, United Automobile Workers, and the Kentucky Building and Trades Council. In May 2014, Jensen was endorsed by Governor Steve Beshear and The Lexington Herald-Leader. Jensen won the Democratic nomination in the primary with 61% of the vote. After the primary, Jensen's campaign received attention from the Democratic Congressional Campaign Committee which placed her campaign on their "Emerging Races" initiative.

Jensen's campaign received national attention due to Jensen's decision to campaign based on the success of Kynect, Kentucky's health insurance marketplace created in accordance with the Patient Protection and Affordable Care Act. On May 12, 2014, Jensen appeared on All In with Chris Hayes to discuss Kynect. Barr defeated Jensen in the general election by 60% to 40%.

References

External links
Official campaign site
Official Facebook
Official Twitter
The Race for Education

Kentucky Democrats
Living people
Women in Kentucky politics
Disney executives
American political activists
Education activists
People in horse racing
Fashion Institute of Technology alumni
Politicians from Fort Wayne, Indiana
Politicians from Lexington, Kentucky
Year of birth missing (living people)
Alumni of Aiglon College